Julian Agyeman  is a Professor of Urban and Environmental Policy and Planning, and Fletcher Professor of Rhetoric and Debate, at Tufts University,. He is co-founder and editor-in-chief of Local Environment: The International Journal of Justice and Sustainability. He is a Fellow of the Royal Society of the Arts and the Royal Geographical Society.

In the early 2000s, Agyeman developed the concept of just sustainabilities, defined as “the need to ensure a better quality of life for all, now, and into the future, in a just and equitable manner, whilst living within the limits of supporting ecosystems”. His book on the subject, Introducing Just Sustainabilities: Policy, Planning, and Practice, is widely used at universities.

Education
Agyeman received a B.Sc. with Joint Honors in Geography and Botany from Durham University in 1980,  an M.A. in Conservation Policy from Middlesex University in 1987 and a Ph.D. in Urban Studies from the University of London in 1996.

Publications
Including his books and journal articles, Agyeman has over 150 publications in his field. His article, Mind the Gap: Why do people act environmentally and what are the barriers to pro-environmental behavior?, published in Environmental Education Research, is the most cited journal article by a North American urban planning scholar. His publications have led him to be ranked as one of the top 15 most highly cited urban planning faculty in North America. His work integrates multiple academic disciplines, including geography, sociology, urban planning and policy, environmental justice, and sustainability.

Books
Sustainable Communities and the Challenge of Environmental Justice (NYU Press, 2005)
Introducing Just Sustainabilities: Policy, Planning and Practice (Zed Books, 2013)

Co-authored books
Sharing Cities: A Case for Truly Smart and Sustainable Cities (MIT Press, 2015)

Co-edited books
Just Sustainabilities: Development in an Unequal World (MIT Press, 2003)
The New Countryside?: Ethnicity, Nation and Exclusion in Contemporary Rural Britain (Policy Press, 2006) 
Environmental Justice and Sustainability in the Former Soviet Union (MIT Press, 2009)
Speaking for Ourselves: Environmental Justice in Canada (UBC Press, 2010)
Cultivating Food Justice: Race, Class and Sustainability (MIT Press, 2011)
Environmental Inequalities Beyond Borders: Local Perspectives on Global Injustices (MIT Press, 2011)
Incomplete Streets: Processes, Practices, and Possibilities (Routledge, 2014)
Food Trucks, Cultural Identity, and Social Justice: From Loncheras to Lobsta Love (MIT Press, 2017)
The Immigrant-Food Nexus: Borders, Labor, and Identity in North America (MIT Press, 2020)
Sacred Civics: Building Seven Generation Cities (Routledge, 2022)

Career

Editorships 

Co-founder (1996) and Editor-in-Chief of Local Environment: The International Journal of Justice and Sustainability
Co-Editor of the Routledge Equity, Justice and the Sustainable City Series 
Co-Editor of the Bristol University/Policy Press Series Smart Sharing Cities: Technology, Sustainability, Ethics and Politics
Contributing Editor to Environment: Science and Policy for Sustainable Development 
Member of the Editorial Board of the Australian Journal of Environmental Education
Series Editor of Just Sustainabilities: Policy, Planning and Practice published by Zed Books

Awards 
He is a Fellow of the Royal Society of Arts (1996) and the  Royal Geographical Society (2016). He received the  Benton H. Box Award  from Clemson University Institute for Parks in 2015 and the Athena City Accolade from the KTH Royal Institute of Technology in 2018.

Visiting professorships
Agyeman has been a visiting professor at University of South Australia (2008–13), Northumbria University (2010-14), University of British Columbia (April–May 2011) and McGill University (2017-18); he also held the Walker Ames Visiting Professorship at the University of Washington (2017). He is currently the TD Walter Bean Visiting Professor at the University of Waterloo, Canada (2020-21). 
He held a Visiting Fellowship at The Pacific Institute for Climate Solutions, hosted by the University of Victoria (2011). Agyeman was a Senior Scholar at The Center for Humans and Nature (2013–16) and a Fellow of the McConnell Foundation's Cities for People program in Montréal (2017).

Advisory positions
Agyeman currently sits on the Academic Board of The Centre for the Future of Places (KTH Royal Institute of Technology, Stockholm) and the Board of Directors of EcoDistricts. He is also on the Advisory Boards of Shareable, Institute for Transportation & Development Policy - US, Participatory City, Urban Sharing, Equiticity and Sharecity, and the McConnell Foundation’s Cities for People Future Cities Canada programs.  In November 2021, he was an advisor on Michelle Wu's Transition Committee for her transition into the office of mayor of Boston. Additionally, he is a Founding Senior Advisor/Thought Leader at PlacemakingX.

References

External links
Official Julian Agyeman Website
Julian Agyeman’s Tufts Faculty Page
Just Sustainabilities Blog
Interview with WBUR

Fellows of the Royal Geographical Society
Alumni of Van Mildert College, Durham
Alumni of Middlesex University
Alumni of the University of London
Living people
Academic journal editors
Tufts University faculty
British expatriate academics in the United States
British geographers
1958 births